Brooklyn Community Board 7 is a New York City community board that encompasses the Brooklyn neighborhoods of Sunset Park, Windsor Terrace, Greenwood Heights and South Park Slope. It is delimited by Gowanus Bay on the west; by 15th Street and Prospect Park South West on the north; and by Caton Avenue, Fort Hamilton Parkway, 37th Street and 8th Avenue on the east, as well as by the Long Island Rail Road and Bay Ridge R.R. Yards on the south.

Its current chairman is Cesar Zuniga and its district manager is Jeremy Laufer.

As of the United States Census, 2000, the Community Board has a population of 120,063, up from 102,553 in 1990 and 98,564 in 1980. Of them (as of 2000), 27,369 (22.8%) are White non Hispanic, 4,203 (3.5%) are African-American, 20,911 (17.4%) Asian or Pacific Islander, 258 (0.2%) American Indian or Native Alaskan, 668(0.6%) of some other race, 3,322 (2.8%) of two or more race, 63,332 (52.7%) of Hispanic origins. 40.7% of the population benefit from public assistance as of 2004, up from 23.0% in 2000.

References

External links
Profile of the Community Board (PDF)
Official website of the Community Board
Official CB 7 Sunset Park 197-a plan for public review (August 2007)
Brooklyn neighborhood map

Community boards of Brooklyn
Sunset Park, Brooklyn